Dimitrios Patrinos (died 1903) was a Greek MP for Achaia and a mayor of Patras.

Patrinos was born in Patras and was the only son of merchant and politician Panagiotis Patrinos. He was first elected MP in 1868.

He became mayor of the city of Patras where he served from 1883 until 1887. He took over the municipality with 400,000 drachmas in debt. During his tenure he caused a lot of backlash for his insistence on establishing a municipal secret police.

He died in 1903. He survived with his wife which she was a relative of the prime minister Dimitrios Voulgaris.

References

1903 deaths
Mayors of Patras
Year of birth unknown
Politicians from Patras
Greek MPs 1879–1881
Greek MPs 1868–1869
Greek MPs 1872
Greek MPs 1874–1875
Greek MPs 1875–1879